K. P. Suveeran is a film and drama director from Kozhikode. His first movie Byari won the National Film Award for Best Film in 2011. This is the first feature film to be made in the Beary language.

Biography
Suveeran is a native of Azhiyur, Kozhikode. After completing his course at the School of Drama, Calicut University, Trichur, and the School of Performing Arts, Pondicherry, though he was expelled from the National School of Drama, Delhi in his final year. Recognized as an actor, director and painter, he has to his credit almost thirty plays and four short films which have also received many awards. He has also published articles in leading periodicals in Kerala, published many short stories and a novelette and translated the plays Yerma, Island and Crime Passional into Malayalam.

Suveeran started his career as a director in Malayalam amateur drama, and first came to notice with his plays Agni, and Udambadokkolam. He secured the Sangeetha Nataka Academy awards for three years and the Mahindra Excellence in Theatre Award in 2011 for his latest drama Ayussinte Pusthakam.

Filmography
Byari
Mazhayathu

Awards and recognition
 National Film Award for Best Feature Film, India, 2011  - Byari
 SAARC Best Feature Film (Bronze), 2012 - Byari 
 Theatre Award, 2011 - Ayussinte Pusthakam
 Kerala Sangeetha Nataka Akademi Award, 2019
 Recipient of Ladly National Media Award
 Bharathan Purasaaram 
 Drishya Kala Ratna

References

Film directors from Kerala
Kerala State Film Award winners
Living people
Malayalam film directors
Malayalam screenwriters
Artists from Kozhikode
21st-century Indian film directors
Directors who won the Best Feature Film National Film Award
Year of birth missing (living people)
Recipients of the Kerala Sangeetha Nataka Akademi Award